Barry Johnson (born 17 June 1984) is an Irish hurler. His National Hurling League and All-Ireland Senior Hurling Championship career with the Cork senior hurling team lasted one season.

Born in Bartlemy, County Cork, Johnson first played hurling and Gaelic football with the Bride Rovers club. After playing in both codes in juvenile and underage grades at a divisional level, he won a Munster Intermediate Club Hurling Championship medal in 2003, having earlier won a county intermediate championship medal.

Johnson made his debut on the inter-county scene at the age of nineteen when he was selected for the Cork intermediate team. He won an All-Ireland medal as a non-playing substitute in 2004. Johnson later joined the Cork senior team as captain of the team during the 2008–09 senior hurling team strike. He was a regular during the National Hurling League and was retained as a member of the championship panel when the strike was called off.

Career statistics

Club

Honours

Bride Rovers
Munster Intermediate Club Hurling Championship (1): 2003
Cork Intermediate Hurling Championship (1): 2003

Cork
All-Ireland Intermediate Hurling Championship (1): 2004
Munster Intermediate Hurling Championship (1): 2004

References

1984 births
Living people
Bride Rovers hurlers
Cork inter-county hurlers